Oldtown is an unincorporated community in Xenia Township, Greene County, in the U.S. state of Ohio.

History
Oldtown was founded on a site which had been home to one of Ohio's largest Shawnee settlements. 

White settlers first called the place Old Chillicothe, and under the latter name was it platted in 1839. A post office called Old Town was established in 1886, and remained in operation until 1902.

The Great Council State Park, with a mission of educating the public about Tecumseh and the Shawnee, is scheduled to open in Oldtown in 2023.

References

Unincorporated communities in Greene County, Ohio
1839 establishments in Ohio
Populated places established in 1839
Unincorporated communities in Ohio